VTB United League is an international professional men's club basketball league that was founded in 2008. It is made up of mostly Russian clubs, along with one each from Belarus and Kazakhstan. Since 2013, it is the first tier of Russian professional club basketball. Therefore, the highest placed Russian team in the league is also named Russian national champions. The league is sponsored by Russian state-owned VTB Bank. In 2008 CSKA Moscow won VTB United League Promo-Cup, but this competition does not count as official VTB title.

The current champions are Zenit Saint Petersburg, who secured their 1st ever title after defeating former champions CSKA Moscow 4–3 in the 2022 Finals. CSKA have dominated the league, having won all but two title in its existence. The VTB United League also holds a youth competition, the VTB United Youth League.

Formats
In its inaugural 2009–10 season, the VTB United League featured clubs from Estonia, Latvia, Lithuania, Russia, and Ukraine. For the 2010–11 season, teams from Belarus, Finland, and Poland were added to the league. The 2011–12 season featured 18 teams, with new teams being added from the Czech Republic and Kazakhstan. In the 2012–13 season, the number of teams increased to 20. The number of teams decreased to 16 for the 2014–15 season, and the teams from Lithuania and Ukraine dropped out of the league.

During the 2021–22 season, ten teams were left to compete after the Polish and Estonian clubs withdrew from the league in protest against the Russian invasion of Ukraine.

History
The first step in the creation of the league was a competition named the VTB United League Promo-Cup held in Moscow in December 2008. The final of the Promo-Cup was played on December 22, 2008, and was won by CSKA Moscow, who defeated Khimki 70–66. Kyiv ended third.

Unification with the Russian PBL
In May 2012, all the PBL clubs gathered to decide which format would be used for the next season, and some club's directors raised the possibility of uniting with the VTB United League, to produce greater competition between the Russian basketball clubs. They suggested that the new league be named the Eastern European Professional Basketball League.

In July 2012, the Council of VTB United League decided that the PBL league would continue for one more year, with some games of the VTB United League that took place between two Russian clubs being counted as PBL games. The first tier Russian clubs then replaced the PBL with the VTB United League as their new national domestic league, starting with the 2013-14 season.

The VTB United League was recognized by FIBA Europe in September 2013. The league was then officially recognized by FIBA World in October 2014. The league needed to be recognized by both bodies, because it contains clubs that come from countries that are part of both the European and Asian FIBA zones.

The honorary head of the league is Sergei Ivanov and its official sponsor is Pavel Vrublevsky of ChronoPay.

Arena rules
In order for clubs to play in the VTB United League, they must have a home arena that has a seating capacity of at least 3,000 seats.

Current clubs

Team appearances

Results

 The whole 2008 tournament was staged in Moscow, including the Final Four.
2008 tournament does not count as official VTB title.

Russian basketball clubs in European and worldwide competitions

Awards

Records

Sponsor 
 VTB Bank

Although during 2014 Andrey Kostin's VTB Bank contributed 150 million rubles to VTB Union League which was third to its 4.5 billion rubles contributed to FC Dynamo Moscow and 750 million rubles contributed to support HC Dynamo Moscow, his VTB bank recorded very large losses of 5 billion rubles in March 2015 connected to its sponsorships and contributions to charities of over a total of 15.5 billion rubles that had 10 billion rubles given to undisclosed recipients. This led to the Bank of Moscow giving VTB Bank an 8 billion rubles loan at 0.51% per year with maturity in 2021. Of VTB Bank money given away during 2014, 80% of the total of 17.5 billion rubles were given away in the fourth quarter.

See also 
 Basketball in Russia 
 Russian Professional Championship
 Russian Professional League
 Russian Super League 1
 USSR Premier League
 Russian Cup
 USSR Cup
 Adriatic League
 Baltic League

References

External links 
 Official website

 
Basketball leagues in Estonia
Basketball leagues in Latvia
Basketball leagues in Lithuania
Basketball leagues in Russia
Basketball leagues in Ukraine
Basketball leagues in Belarus
2009 establishments in Russia
Sports leagues established in 2009
Sports leagues in Russia
Professional sports leagues in Russia
Professional sports leagues in Poland
Professional sports leagues in Belarus
Multi-national professional sports leagues